Use Your Illusion World Tour – 1992 in Tokyo II is a live VHS/DVD by American hard rock band Guns N' Roses.  Filmed live at the Tokyo Dome, Japan, on February 22, 1992, during the Japanese leg of the Use Your Illusion Tour, this recording features the second half of the concert, the first half appearing on sister volume Use Your Illusion I. Both VHS titles were distributed by Geffen Home Video in 1992.

The songs "You Could Be Mine", "Move to the City" and "Estranged" from this event were used in the band's 1999 live album Live Era: '87-'93.

The release is certified gold by the RIAA, selling 50,000 copies.

Track listing 
"Introduction"
"You Could Be Mine"
"Drum Solo & Guitar Solo"
"Theme from "The Godfather""
"Sweet Child o' Mine"
"So Fine"
"Rocket Queen" (w/ "It Tastes Good, Don't It?")
"Move to the City"
"Knockin' on Heaven's Door"
"Estranged"
"Paradise City"

Credits 
Uzi Suicide Co.; an original production of TDK Core Co., Ltd. and Japanese Satellite Broadcasting

Artists 

Guns N' Roses:
W. Axl Rose – lead vocals, piano, tambourine, whistle
Slash – lead guitar, backing vocals, talkbox
Duff McKagan – bass, timpani, backing vocals, lead vocals
Matt Sorum – drums, percussion, backing vocals
Dizzy Reed – keyboards, percussion, backing vocals, tambourine
Gilby Clarke – rhythm guitar, backing vocals
Guests:
Cece Worrall-Rubin, Lisa Maxwell, Anne King – horns
Tracey Amos, Roberta Freeman – backing vocals
Teddy Andreadis – keyboards, harmonica, backing vocals

Crew 

Director: Paul Becher
Producers: Shuji Wakai, Tsugihiko Imai, Tamamatsu Kuwata, Ichiro Misu, Yasumi Takeuchi, Noboru Shimasaki, Reiko Nakano, Shigeo Iguro
Light Design: Phil Ealy
Sound Engineers: David Kehrer, Jim Mitchell
Art Director: Kevin Reagan

Certifications

References

External links 

Guns N' Roses video albums
Albums recorded at the Tokyo Dome
1992 video albums